The Jaguar XF (X250) is an executive luxury sports sedan car that was manufactured and marketed by the British automobile manufacturer Jaguar Cars. The XF was available as a four-door saloon and a five-door estate marketed as the Sportbrake. Launched Autumn 2007 as a replacement for the S-Type, the XF was designated internally as the X250. The X250 was succeeded by the X260 in 2015. X250 was the first of the new styled Jaguars.

Overview
The XF was developed at Jaguar's Whitley design and development HQ in Whitley, Coventry and was built at Castle Bromwich Assembly facility in Birmingham. 

Initially, the XF was planned to use an all aluminium platform but due to time constraints put by Jaguar's board on the development team, the X250 makes use of a heavily modified Ford DEW98 platform.

The XF was launched at the 2007 Frankfurt Motor Show, following the public showing of the C-XF concept in January 2007 at the North American International Auto Show. Customer deliveries commenced in March 2008, with a range of V6 and V8 engines. 

Designed by Jaguar's design director Ian Callum, the styling incorporates an oval mesh grille recalling the original XJ of 1968. The boot lid retained the S-Type's chromed blade to its edge and included a "leaper" hood ornament.

The XF was launched with a variety of trims called, depending on country, 'SE' (or 'Sport'), 'Luxury', 'Premium Luxury' (or 'Premium'), 'Portfolio' (or 'Premium Portfolio'), 'SV8' (or 'Supercharged') and 'R'. For the UK market, company car-friendly 'Executive Edition' and 'SE Business' models with a lower tuned versions of the 3.0 L and 2.2 L diesel engines respectively were available. 

The interior included air conditioning vents which are flush-fitting in the dash, rotating open once the engine is started, and a rotating gearshift dial, marketed as JaguarDrive Selector, which automatically elevates from the centre console. Another departure from the traditional Jaguar cabin ambiance is the use of pale-blue backlighting to the instruments, switchgear, and around major control panels. Some minor systems, such as the interior lighting, are controlled by touching the light covers. The glove compartment also opens to the touch. The XF has no cloth interior option, with all trim levels featuring leathers. Wood veneers are available along with aluminium, carbon fibre and piano black lacquer trims.

Models

XFR (2009–2015)

Facelift (2011)

In April 2011, Jaguar revealed the details of a facelift for the XF at the New York International Auto Show, with manufacturing beginning in July 2011.

XF Sportbrake (2012–2015)

The Sportbrake was officially introduced in March 2012, and went on-sale in October of the same year.
The maximum capacity surpasses that of the contemporary BMW 5 Series Touring, Cadillac CTS Sport Wagon, and the Mercedes-Benz CLS-Class (X218) Shooting Brake.

XFR-S
An R-S version of the XF was confirmed in 2012 following an image released shortly before the Los Angeles Auto Show. It uses the same 5.0-litre supercharged V8 engine as the Jaguar XKR-S.

The XFR-S differs from the XFR as it has bespoke 20-inch alloy wheels, wider front grills and carbon fibre. The front grills aid aerodynamic efficiency as does the large rear wing and rear diffuser.

Specifications

Aerodynamics
The XF's body was developed using computational fluid dynamics (CFD) before wind tunnel testing. Every area from the outer skin to the lightweight, composite undertray to the cooling airflow (even the shape of the exterior mirrors) was optimised using this process. The higher, squarer tail is more efficient aerodynamically than a lower, rounded one, and the XF's coupé-like roofline and raised bootlid lip improve airflow over the rear of the car.

Chassis
The basic substructure of the XF has been carried over from the preceding S-Type, although the body has been stretched to meet crash safety requirements, and heightened to provide additional headroom while still retaining the "saloon within a coupé" proportions. The suspension and mountings are the same as that used on the XK, while the engine line-up is basically similar to that used in the S-Type.

Sound and vibration insulation is provided by the addition of a special underbody tray and engine mounts, a tuned exhaust system, and a double bulkhead between the engine bay and passenger compartment.

Engines
All XF models are automatic and are Euro 5 compliant. The naturally-aspirated petrol 3.0-litre V6 was discontinued in Europe in 2010, but continued to be sold elsewhere for the X250's production lifespan.

Next Green Car (NGC) an organisation that analyses vehicle emissions and rates them from 0 (cleanest) to 100 (dirtiest) – analysed the emissions from X250 XF's range: ADAC's EcoTest has also rated three of the diesel engines.

The 2.7-litre V6 diesel engine was replaced in 2009 with a new 3.0-litre V6 diesel engine. The engine is the same as the 3.0-litre TDV6 used in the Land Rover Discovery 4 with the newly used ZF 8 speed automatic transmission. The AJ-V6D Gen III, came in two states of tune. The diesel engines are a product of the joint venture between Ford and Peugeot-Citroën.

Transmissions
The XF was launched with only an automatic gearbox, and all models initially used the six-speed ZF 6HP26 automatic transmission. For model years 2010–2012, some engines (the 3.0 L diesel and 5.0 L supercharged petrol) used the second generation six-speed ZF 6HP28 transmission. During 2012–2013, 8-speed ZF 8HP70 transmissions replaced the 6-speed transmissions for all engines. The gears can either be selected using a rotary dial that rises from the centre console on start-up or can be manually controlled using paddles behind the steering wheel. AWD is available in both RHD and LHD markets with variances according to consumer demand for engine types. Entry level 2.0-litre diesel models are available in AWD in UK RHD, however petrol AWD models are not available in that market.

Equipment

Sound system
The standard audio system comprises a ten-speaker, 250 W set-up that includes a radio, CD player, WMA and MP3 compatibility as well as USB storage devices.

From 2008 to 2012, there was an optional Bowers & Wilkins (B&W) sound system available.  At its core there are 14 speakers which (with the exception of the aluminium high-frequency tweeters) employ B&W's Kevlar composite speaker cones. Each front door contains a  woofer, a  mid-range speaker and a  dome tweeter (the latter two wired in parallel with a crossover), while each rear door houses a similar  woofer and  tweeter. As a centre speaker there is a  full-range driver, similar to the two  full-range 'surround' speakers located on the rear parcel shelf. The B&W system has been reviewed by journalists at Autocar magazine, who proclaimed it the best in-car system they have ever heard.

For 2013 models, Jaguar introduced the option of a new Meridian sound system upgrade instead of B&W; with a choice of 380 W 11-speaker or an 825 W surround sound 17-speaker system.

Multimedia interaction
A 7-inch full-colour screen is fitted to the dashboard of all XFs and can be used to control most multimedia systems.  The same screen can also be upgraded with analogue and digital television capability.  Available as an option is JaguarVoice which allows the driver to speak commands to control everything from the sound and navigation systems to telephone calls and the climate control system.

Safety
The XF was crash tested in 2010 by Euro NCAP and it gained a four star rating. The XF's result was seen as a disappointment by some car magazines. When retested in 2011, the XF showed improved scores in adult occupant, child occupant and pedestrian areas.

The Australasian New Car Assessment Program (ANCAP) also tested the XF and gave it a score of 32.38 points out of 37, giving it an ANCAP rating of 4 out of 5.

Thatcham's New Car Whiplash Ratings awarded the XF 'good' score for Geometric, Dynamic and Overall ratings.

Security
Deadlocks, an alarm and an engine immobiliser are fitted as standard to the XF. The car also locks itself when it reaches a pre-set speed to help protect against carjackings. The XF was tested by Thatcham's New Vehicle Security Ratings (NVSR) organisation and achieved the following ratings:

Speed record

Police car

A special version of the XF Diesel S was announced in 2009 for the UK police car market, with the first police force orders in 2010.
Its emergency vehicle equipment included a roof-mounted light bar with 3,600 light elements, side alley lights, blue and white strobing LEDs in the grille and blue flashing LEDs along the side of the car, blue and red flashing LED lights in the rear light clusters.

Worldwide sales 
Total sales do not include years 2007 and 2008.

Awards
The concept C-XF was awarded 2007 North American Production Preview Vehicle of the Year award.
What Diesel? magazine awarded the XF both the Car of the Year and Best Executive Car awards in 2008.
In 2009, What Diesel? magazine, for the second year running, awarded the XF both the Car of the Year and Best Executive Car awards.
The XF won the What Car? Best Executive Car category again in 2009,
The XF won the What Car? Best Executive Car award for the third time in 2010.
For the fourth successive year, the XF won the What Car? Best Executive Car award in 2011.
In August 2011, the XF was awarded Car of the Decade by Auto Express.
In November 2016, the XF was awarded Best Saloon by Golden Steering Wheel Awards.

References

External links

Media kits: C-XF, XF, XF model year 2012

XF (X250)
Executive cars
Mid-size cars
Sports sedans
Rear-wheel-drive vehicles
2010s cars
Cars introduced in 2007
ANCAP executive cars
Euro NCAP executive cars
Limousines